SWI/SNF-related matrix-associated actin-dependent regulator of chromatin subfamily A-like protein 1 is a protein that in humans is encoded by the SMARCAL1 gene.

Function 

The protein encoded by this gene is a member of the SWI/SNF family of proteins. Members of this family have helicase and ATPase activities and are thought to regulate transcription of certain genes by altering the chromatin structure around those genes. The SMARCAL1 protein convert RPA-bound, single stranded DNA into double-stranded DNA, an enzyme activity termed "annealing helicase".

The encoded protein shows sequence similarity to the E. coli RNA polymerase-binding protein HepA. Mutations in this gene are a cause of Schimke immunoosseous dysplasia (SIOD), an autosomal recessive disorder with the diagnostic features of spondyloepiphyseal dysplasia, renal dysfunction, and T-cell immunodeficiency.

Model organisms

Model organisms have been used in the study of SMARCAL1 function. A conditional knockout mouse line, called Smarcal1tm1a(EUCOMM)Wtsi was generated as part of the International Knockout Mouse Consortium program — a high-throughput mutagenesis project to generate and distribute animal models of disease to interested scientists.

Male and female animals underwent a standardized phenotypic screen to determine the effects of deletion. Twenty tests were carried out and one significant phenotype was observed: homozygous mutant mice had abnormal brain histopathology, including an enlarged hippocampus and a thickened hippocampus stratum oriens.

References

Further reading

External links 
 GeneReviews/NCBI/NIH/UW entry on Schimke Immunoosseous Dysplasia

Genes mutated in mice